Richard Knowles Tyldesley (11 March 1897 – 17 September 1943) was a Lancashire cricketer who was one of the most important figures in Lancashire breaking Yorkshire's stronghold on the County Championship between 1926 and 1930.

He was the youngest of four brothers who all played for Lancashire, but were unrelated to the Worsley family that produced the two famous brothers Johnny and Ernest Tyldesley. Dick first played for Lancashire in 1919 and, with Dean out of form and Cook still in the Army, gained a regular place as a slow bowler. Though he kept a perfect length and could flight the ball extremely well, at this early stage Tyldesley had so little spin that he was not a deadly force on sticky wickets. He also showed promise as a hard-hitting batsman and demonstrated his ability as a close-catching field.

By 1921, he was one of the leading bowlers for Lancashire, and in 1922, gaining more spin on the ball on sticky wickets, Dick Tyldesley took 100 first-class wickets. He also hit up 105 against Nottinghamshire at Old Trafford and remarkably was Lancashire's fourth-highest run-scorer - though with less than half the aggregates of Ernest Tyldesley, Hallows and Makepeace. It was from 1923, however, that he leaped to the top of the tree though increasing his finger spin to make him a deadly bowler on the many sticky pitches found in the North. He took 140 wickets that year, and in 1924 - a summer so wet that only one Lancashire match was played throughout on a pitch unaffected by rain - he was consistently deadly except against the most exceptionally skilled batsmen.

His record that summer won him a place on the Ashes tour of 1924/1925, but he was a dreadful failure on the cast-iron Australian wickets where the ball came straight through. His wickets for the whole tour cost 41 runs apiece - a remarkable contrast to his record in England! However, at home Tyldesley maintained his form as a bowler exceptionally well, and after a slight lapse in 1927 and 1928 he was back at his best in 1929, heading the bowling averages and invariably proving unplayable after showers in a very dry summer. With Australian paceman Ted McDonald, Tyldesley formed a bowling combination that was sufficient to give Lancashire a hat-trick of Championship wins between 1926 and 1928: during these three years McDonald took 484 wickets and Tyldesley 303 - though Tyldesley actually had a better average. As a batsman, though, Dick Tyldesley declined to the point of only making two fifties after 1926.

In 1930 Tyldesley took 121 wickets for under 15 each and played a vital role in Lancashire's fourth Championship in five years. He was recalled to the Test side with only moderate success, but remained Lancashire's leading bowler in 1931. Unfortunately, that was to prove his last season of county cricket because of a dispute with the committee. He played for some years in the Lancashire League, as professional for Haslingden (1932), East Lancashire (1933), Accrington (1934–35) and Lowerhouse (1936) and was then landlord of the Dog and Pheasant pub at Wingates, Westhoughton. He played one more first-class match, for Sir L Parkinson's XI v Leicestershire, at Blackpool, in 1935. Often viewed as overweight, he died at the young age of forty-six in 1943.

References

External links

1897 births
1943 deaths
People from Westhoughton
England Test cricketers
English cricketers
Lancashire cricketers
Wisden Cricketers of the Year
Players cricketers
Marylebone Cricket Club cricketers
English cricketers of 1919 to 1945
North v South cricketers
Sir L. Parkinson's XI cricketers